Barnimie  is a village in the administrative district of Gmina Drawno, within Choszczno County, West Pomeranian Voivodeship, in north-western Poland.

A historic Sacred Heart church, dating back to the 15th century, is located in Barnimie.

References

Barnimie